Pico Naiguatá is the summit of a mountain in South America near Caracas, Venezuela, part of the Venezuelan Coastal Range, of which it is the highest peak. It is situated on the border of the Venezuelan states Miranda and Vargas.

See also

List of Ultras of South America
Preston Somers Expedition

References

External links

Naiguata
Geography of Miranda (state)
Geography of Vargas (state)
El Ávila National Park